The Fort Payne Formation, or Fort Payne Chert, is a geologic formation found in the southeastern region of the United States. It is a Mississippian Period cherty limestone, that overlies the Chattanooga Shale (or locally the Maury Formation), and underlies the St. Louis Limestone (lower Tuscumbia Limestone in Alabama).  To the north, it grades into the siltstone Borden Formation. It preserves fossils dating back to the Carboniferous period.

Eugene Allen Smith named the Fort Payne Formation for outcrops at Fort Payne, Alabama.

See also 
 
 
 Mississippian (geologic period)
 List of fossiliferous stratigraphic units in Kentucky

References

Geologic formations of Alabama
Geologic formations of Tennessee
Mississippian United States
Carboniferous Alabama
Carboniferous Kentucky
Carboniferous geology of Tennessee
Viséan
Limestone formations of the United States
Chert
Carboniferous southern paleotemperate deposits
Carboniferous southern paleotropical deposits